Harlingen High School is a public high school located in Harlingen, Texas, United States. It is part of the Harlingen Consolidated Independent School District and was the first of five HCISD high schools established. HHS was the sole high school from its establishment in 1913 to 1993 when the school split and Harlingen High School South was formed. In 2015, the school was rated "Improvement Required" by the Texas Education Agency.

Athletics
The Cardinals are known for their successful football, dance and band programs. The football program has the second most wins of any school south of San Antonio and also has the most playoff appearances of any valley school. The Cardinal football program holds 37 district championships, the most in South Texas. The Harlingen Cardinals compete in the following sports:

Baseball
Basketball
Cheer
Cross Country
Dance
Football
Golf
Marching Band
Soccer
Softball
Swimming and Diving
Tennis
Track and Field
Volleyball
Water Polo
Wrestling

Notable alumni
 Leo Araguz, former NFL player
 Sammy Garza, former NFL player, football coach and scout
 Thomas Haden Church (Class of 1979)
 Johnnie Jackson, former NFL player. Super Bowl winning cornerback with the San Francisco 49ers
 Jimmy Lawrence, former NFL player
 Parker Coppins, YouTuber

References

External links 
 

Educational institutions established in 1913
Buildings and structures in Harlingen, Texas
Harlingen Consolidated Independent School District high schools
1913 establishments in Texas